Central Park is a large urban park located in downtown Winnipeg, and forms the heart of the neighbourhood of the same name.

The area is bound by Notre Dame Avenue to the north, Ellice Avenue to the south, Donald Street to the east and Balmoral Street to the west. Everything within the neighbourhood's one-kilometre loop can be reached within 8 minutes on foot. The neighbourhood is home to the largest concentration of Black Canadians in Manitoba, mostly African immigrants and refugees. 70 percent of all refugees coming to Winnipeg live downtown, largely settling in and around the Central Park area.

It is one of Winnipeg's most densely populated neighbourhoods with around 13,755 people per square km according to Statistics Canada's 2001 Census.

Features

In addition to the Waddell Fountain, the park also features a four-season slide/toboggan facility, an interactive sand and water play area, an open area of artificial turf, and a wading pool and aquatic play pad.

Culture and entertainment

Central Park is a highly diverse neighbourhood. There is a large Filipino, African, and Aboriginal population in the neighbourhood.

Because of the growing African population, the area has been transforming in recent years, giving it a new sense of community and culture. Its Central Market for Global Families is a summer outdoor market that sells handmade and imported African clothing, beadwork, handicrafts, weavings, art, as well as organic produce.

Live entertainment fills the air in Central Park on warm Friday nights throughout the summer and are a significant aspect to the markets on Saturday. Special events attract hundreds of people to the park on World Refugee Day in June, HIV/AIDS Awareness Day in July and Central Park Revival.

Demographics
In 2016, the population of Central Park was 3,775 people, and a population density of 16,221.9 people per square km. Central Park is a lower-income neighbourhood, with a median household income of $25,574, compared to the city's median household income of $68,331.

17.9% of Central Park residents are of Aboriginal Identity, 17.6% are of Aboriginal Ancestry, and 66.2% are other visible minorities. The most represented of which are Black (28.2%) and Filipino (22.5%). As of 2016, 32.9% of Central Park's population are not Canadian citizens, which is above average for the City of Winnipeg as a whole, which is 11.7%. Central Park also boasts a higher percentage of recent immigrants (24.9%) than the city as a whole (7.5%).

Crime

Central Park has a higher crime rate than the city as a whole. In 2012, there was one homicide making the rate per 100,000 residents 28.1. For other crimes, the rates per 100,000 follow as; 2025.3 for robbery, 84.4 for sexual assaults, 534.5 for break and enters and 281.3 for auto thefts.

Architecture

Buildings around Central Park feature a diverse range of architectural styles and densities, coexisting with various shops and services. The YMCA building, Knox United Church, Calvary Temple, and a number of area schools provide a strong institutional component for families and senior citizens. Other landmark buildings are The International Centre, Welcome Place, and Edohei, considered to be Manitoba's first sushi restaurant.

History

Central Park was one of Winnipeg's first four parks, then referred to as "ornamented squares and breathing areas." The land for it was purchased by the city from the Hudson's Bay Company for $20,000 in 1893. The land for the park was swampy in summer and had a significant amount of unusable ground. Thousands of loads of manure and soil were brought in, which caused subsequent settling, but also was responsible for lush lawns and gardens.

A bandstand and two tennis courts were added to the park in 1905, and an iron fence and drinking fountain were added in 1909. The Waddell fountain was added to the park in 1914. Playground equipment was added in 1936 and restrooms in 1959.

In 1985, the city closed off a section of Qu'Appelle Street, expanding the park to Ellice Avenue. The master plan was originally intended to link Central Park to the Manitoba Legislature grounds, but was abandoned at the development of North Portage and Portage Place mall from 1985–1987. This addition brought the park up to 4.8 acres in size.

The park was renovated between 2008 and 2012, with designs by the architecture firm Scatliff+Miller+Murray. The project won the 2015 Premier's Award for Design Excellence Award of Merit in Landscape Architecture.

Waddell Fountain

The Waddell Fountain in Central Park is a rare example of the High Victorian Gothic style in Manitoba, and is based on the Scott Monument, an 1844 Gothic Revival monument in Edinburgh for Romantic poet Sir Walter Scott.

The fountain commemorates Emily Margaret Waddell, who died in 1908. Her will was written in 1904 but only discovered in 1911. In it, Emily Waddell stipulated, "in case of his marrying again, ten thousand dollars is to be expended for public fountain in Central park, Winnipeg." Thomas Waddell, who did remarry, raised the money in 1914 and chose the design by local architect John Manuel. Manuel also designed structures at the University of Manitoba, and would later move to Alberta in 1927 to oversee construction of Canadian Pacific Railway hotels in Banff and Lake Louise.

The fountain was completed by William Penn Stone Company of Minneapolis in 1914 for a cost of $9,722.19, and consisted of white stone on a granite base with a concrete basement to house the water pump.

In 1988, the fountain was declared a historical site. By 1992, it was falling badly into disrepair.

The fountain was dismantled and fixed offsite in 2010 to facilitate needed repairs. The 2010 restoration project won the Heritage Winnipeg Preservation Award.

References

External links
CBC features on Central Park

In-Context Video Documentary on Central Park

Parks in Winnipeg
Tourist attractions in Winnipeg
Central_Park